Carpenters' Hall is the official birthplace of the Commonwealth of Pennsylvania and a key meeting place in the early history of the United States. Carpenters' Hall is located in Independence National Historical Park in Philadelphia, Pennsylvania. 

Completed in 1775, the two-story brick meeting hall was built for and still privately owned by the Carpenters' Company of the City and County of Philadelphia, the country's oldest extant craft guild. The First Continental Congress met here in 1774 and passed and signed the Continental Association. In June, 1776, it was where the Pennsylvania Provincial Conference officially declared the Province of Pennsylvania's independence from the British Empire and established the Commonwealth of Pennsylvania, mobilized the Pennsylvania militia for the American Revolutionary War, set up the machinery for the Pennsylvania Provincial Convention from July 15 to September 28 in 1776, which framed the Pennsylvania Constitution of 1776 and enabled the Declaration of Independence to be written and ultimately adopted. It was briefly occupied in 1777 by the British Army during the war.

The site was designated a National Historic Landmark on April 15, 1970. On November 30, 1982, the Pennsylvania Historical and Museum Commission succeeded in passing Pennsylvania General Assembly 166(R) HR180 to recognize "Carpenters' Hall as the official birthplace of the Commonwealth of Pennsylvania".

History

The land on which Carpenter's Hall is built was purchased on behalf of the Carpenters' Company of Philadelphia in 1768 by Benjamin Loxley, Robert Smith, and Thomas Nevell. The hall was designed by Robert Smith in the Georgian style based on both the town halls of Scotland, where Smith was born, and the villas of Palladio in Italy. The carpenters' guild held their first meeting there on January 21, 1771, and continued to do so until 1777 when the British Army captured Philadelphia. On April 23, 1773 (Saint George's Day), it was used for the founding meeting of the St. George Society of Philadelphia.

The First Continental Congress of the United Colonies of North America met here from September 5 to October 26, 1774, as the Pennsylvania State House (Independence Hall) was being used by the moderate Provincial Assembly of Pennsylvania. It was here that Congress resolved to ban further imports of slaves and to discontinue the slave trade within the colonies, a step toward phasing out slavery in British North America. The building has a long history as an assembly place and has been the home to numerous tenants in the arts, sciences and commerce. The meeting hall served as a hospital for both British and American troops in the Revolutionary War, and other institutions in Philadelphia have held meetings in Carpenters' Hall, including Franklin's Library Company of Philadelphia, the American Philosophical Society, and the First and Second Banks of the United States. The federal Custom House in Philadelphia was located at Carpenter's Hall between 1802 and 1819, save for a brief interruption between January and April, 1811.

It was declared a National Historic Landmark in 1970.

Numerous dignitaries have visited Carpenters' Hall, including United States Supreme Court Chief Justice Warren E. Burger, King Carl XVI Gustaf and Queen Silvia of Sweden, President Václav Havel of the Czech Republic, President Guntis Ulmanis of Latvia, and Texas Governor (later U.S. president) George W. Bush with Pennsylvania governor Tom Ridge.

Today, Carpenters' Hall is free to the public, visited annually by more than 150,000 tourists from around the world. The structure still serves the purpose for which it was built: a meeting place for the Carpenters' Company meetings.

Construction and design

The Carpenters Company was founded in 1724, but had no meeting house of their own, resorting to rented tavern rooms for their meetings. Carpenters Company members finally selected a new building site in 1768 on Chestnut Street, a few hundred feet from Benjamin Franklin's home. Robert Smith submitted the plans for the design, but did not supervise the construction of the hall. The decision to proceed with construction was made January 30, 1770. Construction was completed in August 1774.

Gallery

See also

 Continental Association, the 1774 founding document and system created by the First Continental Congress for implementing a trade boycott with Great Britain
 List of National Historic Landmarks in Philadelphia
 National Register of Historic Places listings in Center City, Philadelphia
 Founding Fathers of the United States

References

External links

 Carpenters' Hall homepage
 
 
  The Carpenters' Company of the City and County of Philadelphia published 1887

Buildings and structures in Independence National Historical Park
American Revolutionary War museums in Pennsylvania
Museums in Philadelphia
Old City, Philadelphia
Carpenters' trade unions
Government buildings completed in 1773
Buildings and structures on the National Register of Historic Places in Philadelphia
Clubhouses on the National Register of Historic Places in Pennsylvania
National Historic Landmarks in Pennsylvania
Historic district contributing properties in Pennsylvania
American Revolutionary War sites
Continental Congress
Former national capitol buildings in the United States
Historic American Buildings Survey in Philadelphia
18th-century architecture in the United States
Federal architecture in Pennsylvania